"All Around the World" was a single released by The Jam on 15 July 1977. It reached No. 13 in the UK Singles Chart.

The single was backed by the B-side, "Carnaby Street," and was released between the debut album, In the City, and the band's second album, This Is the Modern World.

Track listing

References

1977 singles
The Jam songs
Songs written by Paul Weller
1977 songs